Lisa Glasberg, better known as Lisa G, is an American radio personality. She is employed by iHeartRadio and can be heard on WOR-AM in New York City.

Career

Glasberg was born on November 3, 1956.  Glasberg graduated from Hewlett High School in 1974, and interned at the nearby radio station WLIR. She graduated from Hofstra University. She co-hosted a radio show from 1990 to 1999 on Hot 97 FM with Ed Lover and Doctor Dré. In 2002, they helped launch Power 105.1. For three years, she worked on WOR.

In November 2005, Glasberg joined Howard 100 News, Howard Stern's news team at Sirius XM Satellite Radio, where she worked until 2015. Lisa has been a correspondent for E!'s "Gossip Show", Real TV, WCBS-TV New York and ESPN2's coverage of the New York City Marathon, and is also the voice of 'Running' on the YES Network. On June 18, 2013, she released her first book titled Sex, Lies, and Cookies: An Unrated Memoir.

Honors
 Billboard Air Personality of the Year Award,
 2003 Gracie Allen Award for best local radio host
Hofstra University Radio Hall of Fame 2009

Media appearances
Glasberg was featured on the May/June 2011 cover of Making Music magazine to discuss her life with music.

References

External links 

 

Living people
People from Woodmere, New York
Jewish American journalists
American radio journalists
George W. Hewlett High School alumni
Hofstra University alumni
21st-century American Jews
1956 births